The Treaty of Pipton was signed on 22 June 1265 during the Second Barons' War and concluded an alliance between Simon de Montfort and the Welsh prince Llywelyn ap Gruffudd.

The treaty, signed at Pipton, Powys, came after Simon de Montfort's defeat of English King Henry III at the Battle of Lewes in 1264. The king and his son Prince Edward were captured. Llywelyn began negotiations with de Montfort, and in 1265 offered him the sum of 30,000 marks in exchange for a permanent peace, in which Llywelyn was acknowledged as the Prince of Wales. The treaty established an alliance between Llywelyn and de Montfort, an alliance cemented by the widower Prince agreeing to a betrothal between himself and de Montfort's only daughter Eleanor but the favourable terms primarily that the fealty of all the Princes, Lords and Chieftains of Wales be recognised as belonging to Llywelyn by right of sovereignty indicated de Montfort's desperate need for a counter to the power of the English Marcher Lords.

Pipton
Treaties of Wales
Treaties of medieval England
History of Powys
1265 in England